Tingmo is a steamed bread in Tibetan cuisine. It is sometimes described as a steamed bun that is similar to Chinese flower rolls, with a soft and fluffy texture. It does not contain any kind of filling. A tingmo with some type of filling, like beef or chicken, is called a momo. Tingmo are often paired with vegetable dishes, meat dishes, dal dishes, and phing sha (a dish consisting of cellophane noodles, meat, and wood ear mushrooms). It is speculated that the name "tingmo" is a contraction of "tinga" ("cloud" in the Tibetan language) and "momo" ("dumpling" in the Tibetan language).

See also
 List of steamed foods
 List of Tibetan dishes

References

External links
Tingmo Tibetan steamed bread More than Just Curry (includes photographs and recipe)
Tingmo making video on YouTube (not in English)

Tibetan cuisine
Steamed buns